When Michael Calls is a 1972 American made-for-television mystery-horror-thriller film directed by Philip Leacock and starring Elizabeth Ashley, Ben Gazzara and Michael Douglas.  It was adapted from John Farris' 1967 novel of the same name.

Plot
Helen Connelly is a woman whose nephew Michael died 15 years earlier. She is separated from her husband, Doremus. She is close to Michael's brother, Craig. When mysterious happenings began taking place and she begins receiving phone calls from the supposedly dead Michael, Helen begins to wonder if Michael is really dead or if she is losing touch with reality. Filmed in October - November 1971.

Cast

 Ben Gazzara as Doremus Connelly
 Elizabeth Ashley as Helen Connelly
 Michael Douglas as Craig
 Marian Waldman as Elsa Britton
 Karen Pearson	as Peggy Connelly
 Larry Reynolds as Dr. Britton
 Al Waxman	as Sheriff Hap Washbrook
 Alan McRae as Harry Randall
 Chris Pellett as Peter
 Steve Weston as Enoch Mills
 Robert Warner as Sam
 John Bethune as Quinlan
 William Osler as Prof. Swen
 Michèle Chicoine as Amy

Release
The television film was first broadcast as an ABC Movie of the Week on February 5, 1972.

Home media
The film has been released on VHS and DVD by various small labels.  It also appears under the title Shattered Silence.

References

External links

1972 films
1972 horror films
1972 television films
1970s English-language films
1970s mystery thriller films
1970s psychological thriller films
20th Century Fox Television films
ABC Movie of the Week
American horror thriller films
American mystery thriller films
American psychological thriller films
American horror television films
American films about revenge
Films based on American novels
Films based on thriller novels
Films directed by Philip Leacock
Films shot in Ontario
Films shot in Toronto
Films about telephony
1970s American films